Bhim Bahadur Pande was Nepalese diplomat, bureaucrat and historian. He served as Nepalese Ambassador to India from May 21, 1969 to May 24, 1972. Sardar Bhim Bahadur also served to Juddha Shumsher Jang Bahadur Rana during his youth. He helped out to industrialize the Nepalese Tarai. He later wrote a book about challenges of industrialization in Terai called Tyas Bakhat Ko Nepal. He was a member of representative group of Nepal in the 1950 Indo-Nepal Treaty of Peace and Friendship. He wrote in the same book about the prejudiced and dominant behaviour of Indian authority on signing the Treaty. He also wrote about tyranny of Rana dynasty in the Nepalese literature and education sector.

He also wrote book on genealogy of his ancestral Pande dynasty called Rastra Bhaktiko Jhalak: Panday Bamsa ko Bhumika. His 5 sons are Nepal Army General Sagar Bahadur Pande, Lieu. Gen. Pawan Bahadur Pande, Himalaya Bahadur Pande, Prithvi Bahadur Pande and Shanta Bahadur Pande. Among them Prithvi Bahadur Pande is a renowned Banker and chairman of Nepal Investment Bank.

Notable works 
 Tyas Bakhat Ko Nepal
 Rastrabhakti Ko Jhalak

References 

Nepalese writers
Ambassadors of Nepal to India